Bowentown is an unincorporated community located within Hopewell Township, in Cumberland County, New Jersey, United States.  Located west of Bridgeton, Bowentown got its name from the Bowen family, one of Hopewell Township's first settlers.

References

Hopewell Township, Cumberland County, New Jersey
Unincorporated communities in Cumberland County, New Jersey
Unincorporated communities in New Jersey